Mouse Island is a private island located in Lake Erie off the northern tip of Catawba Point in Ottawa County, Ohio, United States, near the city of Sandusky. It was formerly named "Ship Island", as denoted on early-19th-Century maps (and in some late-18th-Century documents). It was later named Mouse Island for its small size. It is part of Catawba Island Township.

The island was once owned by the American president Rutherford B. Hayes. The Hayes family built two small cabins, a hand ferry to the shore, a tennis court and supplied the island with running water. In the 1930s the island fell into disuse and all amenities were destroyed by fire or neglect. Remains of the structures can still be found on the island today – including the native stone chimneys of the summer cabins as well as part of the foundation.

The Island is privately owned and is not open for public visitation. A limestone reef between the island and shoreline presents a safety hazard for watercraft that draw more than 3 feet.

References

Islands of Ottawa County, Ohio
Islands of Lake Erie in Ohio
Private islands of Ohio
Private islands of the Great Lakes